Nergüin Enkhbat (March 19, 1962 – April 6, 2022) was a Mongolian boxer, born in Ulaanbaatar. At the 1988 Summer Olympics he won the bronze medal in the men's lightweight division.

Olympic results 
1st round bye
Defeated José Pérez (Venezuela) 5-0
Defeated István Turu (Hungary) RSC 3
Defeated Kamal Marjouane (Morocco) 5-0
Lost to George Scott (Sweden) 2-3

References

External links
 
profile

1962 births
2022 deaths
Sportspeople from Ulaanbaatar
Lightweight boxers
Olympic boxers of Mongolia
Boxers at the 1988 Summer Olympics
Olympic bronze medalists for Mongolia
Olympic medalists in boxing
Medalists at the 1988 Summer Olympics
Mongolian male boxers
Boxers at the 1982 Asian Games
Asian Games competitors for Mongolia
Goodwill Games medalists in boxing
Competitors at the 1986 Goodwill Games
20th-century Mongolian people
21st-century Mongolian people